The 1986 Alabama Crimson Tide football team (variously "Alabama", "UA", "Bama" or "The Tide") represented the University of Alabama in the 1986 NCAA Division I-A football season. It was the Crimson Tide's 94th overall and 53rd season as a member of the Southeastern Conference (SEC). The team was led by head coach Ray Perkins, in his fourth year, and played their home games at both Bryant–Denny Stadium in Tuscaloosa and Legion Field in Birmingham, Alabama. They finished the season with a record of ten wins and three losses (10–3 overall, 4–2 in the SEC) and with a victory in the Sun Bowl over Washington.

After opening the season with a victory over Ohio State in the Kickoff Classic, the Crimson Tide won their first seven games and eventually rise to as high as No. 2 in the rankings but lost to eventual national champion Penn State and lost out on an SEC championship after losses to LSU and Auburn. Highlights of the season included their first ever victory over Notre Dame and a 56–28 victory over Tennessee that snapped a four-game losing streak to the Vols.

After the season, Ray Perkins resigned on December 31, to become head coach of the Tampa Bay Buccaneers of the National Football League.

Schedule

Roster

Rankings

Season summary

Ohio State

Vanderbilt

Southern Mississippi

at Florida

Notre Dame

Memphis State

Homecoming

at Tennessee

Penn State

at Mississippi State

LSU

Temple

Auburn

vs. Washington (Sun Bowl)

Awards and honors
Cornelius Bennett – Lombardi Award, SEC Player of the Year, Unanimous First-team All-American

1987 NFL Draft

References
General

 

Specific

Alabama
Alabama Crimson Tide football seasons
Sun Bowl champion seasons
Alabama Crimson Tide football